Dennis Franzin (born 12 July 1993) is a German footballer who plays as an attacking midfielder for FV Nußloch.

References

External links
 

German footballers
Association football midfielders
SV Waldhof Mannheim players
1. FSV Mainz 05 II players
3. Liga players
1993 births
Living people
People from Weinheim
Sportspeople from Karlsruhe (region)
Footballers from Baden-Württemberg